Tushingham cum Grindley is a former civil parish, now in the parish of Tushingham-cum-Grindley, Macefen and Bradley, in the unitary authority of Cheshire West and Chester and the ceremonial county of Cheshire, England. The parish contained the village of Tushingham and the hamlet of Bell o' th' Hill. According to the 2001 UK census, the total population of the civil parish was 166, rising to 187 at the 2011 Census. The civil parish was abolished in 2015 to form Tushingham-cum-Grindley, Macefen and Bradley.

Etymology
The Grindley component of the name has been given as Grenleg' Grenlet, Grenlee, Grynleye, Grynesley, and Gryndley sometimes with Broke, broc, or "le Brock" added to the end since the thirteenth century. It refers to "Green wood" or "clearing" next to a brook. The brook later became known as Wych Brook, and it now forms the county boundary between Cheshire and Shropshire at that point.

For the origins of Tushingham', two possible explanations have been reported: the first was originally put forward by Eilert Ekwall, who concluded that it referred to "the village of Tunsige's people", but a more recent suggestion is that a more direct origin from the Middle English "tuss(h)e" (a tuft of grass or rushes) and "ing" (a place) with "ham" yields a meaning of "the village in the place where tufts of grasses or rushes grow". All the forms of the name that Dodgson records from the Domesday Book onwards begin with "Tus-" as opposed to "Tuns-": Tusigeham, Tussinhgham, Tussincham, Tussingeham, and Tussyncam.

Governance
Tushingham was originally a township in Malpas ancient parish which obtained its separate civil parish status in 1866. As a separate civil parish it has sometimes been known as "Tushingham" or "Tushingham with Grindley". It was originally in Broxton Hundred. From 1837 to 1857 it was in Nantwich Poor law union, and from 1857 to 1930 it was in Whitchurch (in Shropshire) poor law union. It was also part of Whitchurch rural sanitary district. Following the local government restructuring at the end of the nineteenth century, when local districts were formed using rural sanitary districts as a guide, Tushingham joined Malpas Rural District and remained there from 1894 to 1936. From 1936 to 1974 it became part of Tarvin Rural District. From 1974 to 2009 it was part of Chester District, and is currently part of the unitary authority of Cheshire West and Chester.

St Chad's Chapel, Tushingham is a Grade I listed building, and it is reported that there appears to have been a chapel present there since the fourteenth century.

See also

Listed buildings in Tushingham cum Grindley

Notes and references

Notes

Bibliography

Former civil parishes in Cheshire
Cheshire West and Chester